Chlamydomonadaceae is a family of algae within the order Chlamydomonadales.

Genera
As accepted by WoRMS;

 Agloë 
 Brachiomonas 
 Carteria 
 Cercidium 
 Chlainomonas 
 Chlamydomonas 
 Chlamydonephris 
 Chlorobrachis 
 Chloroceras 
 Chloromonas 
 Chlorotriangulum 
 Corbierea 
 Costachloris 
 Cylindromonas 
 Diplostauron 
 Furcilla 
 Gigantochloris 
 Gloeomonas 
 Heterochlamydomonas 
 Hirtusochloris 
 Hyalobrachion 
 Isococcus 
 Ixipapillifera 
 Lobochlamys 
 Lobomonas 
 Microglena 
 Oltmannsiella 
 Oogamochlamys 
 Parapolytoma 
 Peterfiella 
 Phyllariochloris 
 Polytoma 
 Pithiscus 
 Provasoliella 
 Pseudocarteria 
 Pseudofurcilla 
 Pyramichlamys 
 Rhysamphichloris 
 Sanguina 
 Selenochloris 
 Smithsonimonas 
 Sphaerella 
 Sphenochloris 
 Spirogonium 
 Tetrablepharis 
 Tetratoma 
 Tussetia 
 Vitreochlamys 

Former genus
 Platychloris  accepted as Chloromonas
 Prasinochlamydomonas  accepted as Chlamydonephris
 Protococcus  accepted as Chlamydomonas (synonym)
 Sphaerellopsis  accepted as Vitreochlamys (synonym)

References

External links

Chlorophyceae families